Lincoln TMD was a traction maintenance depot located in Lincoln, Lincolnshire, England. The depot was situated on the south side of the Lincoln to Grimsby line and was to the east of Lincoln Central station.

The depot code is LN.

History 
Around 1987, the depot had an allocation of Classes 105 and 114 DMUs. During the 1980s, Classes 03, 08 and 31 locomotives could also be seen stabled at the depot. The depot was closed in the late 1980s.

References

Bibliography

Railway depots in England